Drinah Banda Nyirenda is a Zambian nutritionist and agricultural scientist.

Drinah Nyirenda obtained her BSc in Agricultural Sciences in Zambia. She then did her MSc and PhD at University of California, Davis. She has worked at the University of Zambia for over 26 years. She was the Head of Department of Animal Science, a Professor of Nutrition, and the Dean. In 2011, she promoted the launch of the first BSc in Human Nutrition at the University of Zambia. She is the executive director of Zambia's Programme Against Malnutrition, a board chairperson at the Livestock Development Trust, and a chairperson at the Nutrition Association of Zambia.

References 

Zambian scientists
Nutritionists
Agricultural science
Zambian women scientists
Living people
Year of birth missing (living people)
University of California, Davis alumni